Voice for the Voiceless is a 2019 documentary film directed by Anna Barsukova. The film follows a young girl named Marina, a native of Ekaterinburg. She's an insightful, intelligent and beautiful person, a creative thinker and spiritual type with her own perception of things. Marina works a permanent job and has a 5-year-old daughter. Living with HIV does not prevent Marina from achieving success in life. She is a real-life example of building belief in yourself. By showing her emotional state, the film wants to break the stigma and change the public perception of HIV patients.

The film premiered on March 30, 2019 in Yekaterinburg, and later showed at the 2019 Whistleblower Summit Film Festival in Washington, D.C. and aired on Australian television. Widely covered in Russian and foreign media, received many awards at international film festivals.

Plot 

The film follows Marina, an insightful person and creative thinker with her own perception of things. After learning about her diagnosis, she begins to search for answers to her questions. Feeling confused as her story unfolds and fearing disclosure and condemnation, she chooses to trust her thoughts to her diary. But nothing stays hidden for long…

References

External links 
 
 
Media coverage
 Moscow Director Anna Barsukova presented a film about HIV in Khanty-Mansiysk
 Ugra TV channel about the film Voice for the Voiceless
 Screening of the film "Voice for the Voiceless" in the framework of the festival "Spirit of fire" - TV Ugra report
 THE ZNAMYA CINEMA WILL SHOW THE SOCIALLY SIGNIFICANT FILM "VOICE FOR THE VOICELESS"
 Anna Barsukova: "No one wanted to real their secret"
 I have HIV: how the story of a girl with a" shameful " diagnosis became the script of a documentary* The Odyssey Foundation supported the Serbs and the Director of Voice for the Voiceless
 Actress Olga Budina told "Around TV" about her participation in the film "Voice for the Voiceless" — dir. Anna Barsukova
 Why making a film about HIV in Yekaterinburg turned out to be a problem
 Premiere on RUSTALK TV — Voice for the Voiceless
 Director Anna Barsukova will come to Khanty-Mansiysk with her film
 About the PLHIV without any cheat
 A documentary film by a Director from the Azov region won the Grand Prix

2019 films
Russian documentary films